Gordon Chandler (23 October 1909 – 27 October 2003) was an English cricketer. He played two first-class matches for Cambridge University Cricket Club in 1929.

See also
 List of Cambridge University Cricket Club players

References

External links
 

1909 births
2003 deaths
English cricketers
Cambridge University cricketers
People from Purley, London